is a railway station in the city of Kosai, Shizuoka Prefecture, Japan, operated by the third sector Tenryū Hamanako Railroad.

Lines
Chibata Station is served by the Tenryū Hamanako Line, and is located 62.9 kilometers from the starting point of the line at Kakegawa Station.

Station layout
The station has two opposing side platforms serving two tracks, connected by a level crossing. The two-story station building also serves as the local dental clinic. The station is unattended.

Adjacent stations

|-
!colspan=5|Tenryū Hamanako Railroad

Station History
Chibata Station was established on December 1, 1936, as a station of the Japan National Railway's Futamata-nishi Line. Freight services were discontinued from 1962, and small parcel services from 1970, after which time the station was no longer staffed. After the privatization of JNR on March 15, 1987, the station came under the control of the Tenryū Hamanako Line.

Passenger statistics
In fiscal 2016, the station was used by an average of 50 passengers daily (boarding passengers only).

Surrounding area
Japan National Route 301

See also
 List of Railway Stations in Japan

External links

  Tenryū Hamanako Railroad Station information 
 

Railway stations in Shizuoka Prefecture
Railway stations in Japan opened in 1936
Stations of Tenryū Hamanako Railroad
Kosai, Shizuoka